The Berceuses du chat (Russian: Kolibelniye, English: Cat Lullabies) is a cycle of four songs for contralto and three clarinetists composed by Igor Stravinsky in 1915. The work is usually referred to by its French title. Although it is usually sung in Russian, Stravinsky assisted his friend, the Swiss author C.F. Ramuz, to make a translation into French at the time of publication.

The titles of the four songs are:
 Spi, kot (Sleep, Tom-Cat)
 Kot na pechi (The Tom-Cat on the Stove)
 Bay-Bay (Lullaby)
 U kota, kota (O Tom-Cat, Tom-Cat)

Scoring
Berceuses du chat is set for contralto and three clarinettists:  E clarinet; B and A clarinet; A clarinet and B bass clarinet.

History
The Berceuses du chat were composed in 1915, while Stravinsky was living in Switzerland during World War I.  They are based on Russian folk songs found in the collection of Russian folklorist Pyotr Kireevsky.  Stravinsky had purchased the volume in Kiev during his last trip to Kiev in July 1914, just before the outbreak of the war.

The cycle was first published in Geneva by H.D. Henn in 1917, and subsequently reissued by J.W. Chester (London) around 1920.

Premières
Berceuses du chat was first heard in Paris (Salle des Agriculteurs) on November 20, 1918 in a program that also included the slightly earlier Pribaoutki; both works were accompanied by piano in this performance.  The first performance with clarinets was given in Vienna on June 6, 1919, at a concert of Arnold Schoenberg's Society for Private Musical Performances (Verein für musikalische Privataufführungen).  Again, the program also included the Pribaoutki.

References

Igor Stravinsky
Compositions by Igor Stravinsky